This is a list of films produced in Italy in 2011 (see 2011 in film). Of the 100 or so Italian films released in 2011, about half of them were comedies.

2011

See also
2011 in Italy
2011 in Italian television

References

External links
Italian films of 2011 at the Internet Movie Database

2011
Films
Italian